Barrot is a surname. Notable people with the surname include:

Adolphe Barrot (1801–1870), French diplomat 
Bill Barrot (1944–2016), Australian rules football player
Ferdinand Barrot (1806–1883), French politician
Jacques Barrot (1937–2014), French politician
Odilon Barrot (1791–1873), French politician
Wes Barrot (born 1953), Australian rules football player